Morysville is an unincorporated community in Colebrookdale Township in Berks County, Pennsylvania, United States. Morysville is located at the intersection of Pennsylvania Route 562 and Farmington Avenue.

References

Unincorporated communities in Berks County, Pennsylvania
Unincorporated communities in Pennsylvania